Paul Kemprecos (born March 11, 1939) is an American writer of mysteries and adventure stories. He is a Shamus Award-winning author of six underwater detective thrillers, and had been co-writing with Clive Cussler the "NUMA Files" novels, which focus on Kurt Austin, head of NUMA's Special Assignments Team and his adventures.

Works

Aristotle Socarides
 Cool Blue Tomb (1991)
 Neptune's Eye (1991)
 Death in Deep Water (1992)
 Feeding Frenzy (1993)
 Mayflower Murder (1996)
 Bluefin Blues (1997)
 Gray Lady (2013)
 Shark Bait (2018)

NUMA Files
(co-written with Clive Cussler)

 Serpent (1999)
 Blue Gold (2000)
 Fire Ice (2002)
 White Death (2003)
 Lost City (2004)
 Polar Shift (2005)
 The Navigator (2007)
 Medusa (2009)

Matinicus “Matt” Hawkins
 The Emerald Scepter (2013)
 The Minoan Cipher (2016)

References

External links
 Official Site

20th-century American novelists
Techno-thriller writers
American thriller writers
American mystery writers
Living people
Shamus Award winners
1939 births
21st-century American novelists
American male novelists
20th-century American male writers
21st-century American male writers